Vasco Herculano Salgado Cunha Mango Fernandes (born 12 November 1986) is a Portuguese professional footballer who plays for Casa Pia A.C. as a right-back or a central defender.

He made over 150 Primeira Liga appearances for Leixões, Olhanense, Vitória de Setúbal and Casa Pia, as well as playing professionally in Spain, Greece, Romania and Turkey.

Club career

Early career
Born in Olhão, Algarve of Guinea-Bissauan descent, Fernandes started his professional career with hometown's S.C. Olhanense, making his debut in the Segunda Liga. Prior to that, he was loaned to FC Girondins de Bordeaux from France, but never appeared officially for the Ligue 1 club.

After another loan, now in Spain with UD Salamanca where he teamed up with his compatriot Zé Tó, Fernandes returned to Portugal after being bought by Leixões SC. He played roughly half of the games during the season, as the Matosinhos team overachieved for a final sixth place in the Primeira Liga. His debut in the competition took place on 24 August 2008, when he featured the full 90 minutes in a 1–3 home loss against C.D. Nacional.

Abroad
Fernandes was loaned again for the 2009–10 campaign, also in Spain and in its Segunda División, moving to RC Celta de Vigo. He was much more regularly used than in his previous stint in the country, although the Galicians constantly battled relegation even though they finished 12th.

On 1 July 2010, Fernandes left Leixões permanently and joined Elche CF – still in Spain and its second tier. In the following years he rarely settled with a club, representing S.C. Beira-Mar and Olhanense in his country as well as Platanias FC (Super League) and Aris Thessaloniki FC (lower leagues) in Greece and CS Pandurii Târgu Jiu in the Romanian Liga I.

Vitória Setúbal
On 3 June 2016, aged nearly 31, Fernandes signed a two-year contract with Vitória F.C. in the Portuguese top flight. He scored his first league goal on 17 September of that year, but in a 1–4 home defeat to F.C. Paços de Ferreira.

Fernandes received the first red card of 2017–18, after being sent off with 20 minutes left of the 1–1 home draw with Moreirense FC. He played five games in their Taça da Liga campaign, opening a 2–2 home draw in the final group fixture against S.L. Benfica on 29 December and starting and finishing the loss to Sporting CP by penalty shootout in the final. 

Fernandes stayed for a third season at the Estádio do Bonfim, where he was played consistently and was captain of a side the fans nicknamed "Vasco Fernandes and ten others".

Later career
In August 2019, Fernandes went abroad again to join Ümraniyespor in Turkey's TFF First League, returning home in January 2021 by signing for G.D. Chaves in his first experience in his country's second division for over a decade. Six months later, he moved to Casa Pia A.C. in the same league, being a key player and scoring twice as the Lisbon-based club ended its 83-year exile from the top flight; he then extended his contract to 2023.

International career
All youth levels comprised, Fernandes won 22 caps for Portugal. He first appeared with the under-21 side on 21 August 2007, starting in a 3–0 friendly win over Malta held in Vila do Conde.

Personal life
Fernandes' father, Herculano, was also a footballer and a defender. He too represented Olhanense and, in a 16-year senior career, appeared in one Portuguese top-division game with Académica de Coimbra; he coached his son in Olhanense's juniors, where he played as a forward.

Club statistics

References

External links

Leixões official profile 

1986 births
Living people
People from Olhão
Portuguese sportspeople of Bissau-Guinean descent
Black Portuguese sportspeople
Sportspeople from Faro District
Portuguese footballers
Association football defenders
Primeira Liga players
Liga Portugal 2 players
S.C. Olhanense players
Leixões S.C. players
S.C. Beira-Mar players
Vitória F.C. players
G.D. Chaves players
Casa Pia A.C. players
FC Girondins de Bordeaux players
Segunda División players
UD Salamanca players
RC Celta de Vigo players
Elche CF players
Super League Greece players
Platanias F.C. players
Aris Thessaloniki F.C. players
Liga I players
CS Pandurii Târgu Jiu players
TFF First League players
Ümraniyespor footballers
Portugal youth international footballers
Portugal under-21 international footballers
Portuguese expatriate footballers
Expatriate footballers in France
Expatriate footballers in Spain
Expatriate footballers in Greece
Expatriate footballers in Romania
Expatriate footballers in Turkey
Portuguese expatriate sportspeople in France
Portuguese expatriate sportspeople in Spain
Portuguese expatriate sportspeople in Greece
Portuguese expatriate sportspeople in Romania
Portuguese expatriate sportspeople in Turkey